The 1958 Women's World Chess Championship was a rematch between defending champion Olga Rubtsova and ex-champion Elisabeth Bykova, who she had won the title from in 1956.

The match was played in Moscow from 4 February to 12 March. It was a 16-game event (the first player to reach 8.5 points will be the winner.) Bykova won the match convincingly, regaining the title.

{| class="wikitable" style="text-align:center"
|+Women's World Championship Match 1958
|-
! !! 1 !! 2 !! 3 !! 4 !! 5 !! 6 !! 7 !! 8 !! 9 !! 10 !! 11 !! 12 !! 13 !! 14 !! Total
|-
| align=left | 
| 0 ||style="background:black; color:white"| 1 || 0 ||style="background:black; color:white"| ½ || 0 ||style="background:black; color:white"| ½ || 1 ||style="background:black; color:white"| 1 || 1 ||style="background:black; color:white"| 1 || 1 ||style="background:black; color:white"| 1 || 0 ||style="background:black; color:white"| ½ || 8½
|-
| align=left | 
|style="background:black; color:white"| 1 || 0 ||style="background:black; color:white"| 1 || ½ ||style="background:black; color:white"| 1 || ½ ||style="background:black; color:white"| 0 || 0 ||style="background:black; color:white"| 0 || 0 ||style="background:black; color:white"| 0 || 0 ||style="background:black; color:white"| 1 || ½ || 5½
|}

References

Women's World Chess Championships
1958 in chess